Alexander Borisovich Kosarev (March 15, 1944 – January 19, 2013) was a Soviet Russian film director, writer, actor, poet and lyricist.

Biography 
Kosarev was born on March 15 1944, in Moscow. His father, Boris Kosarev, was a famous Soviet photographer, and the official photographer of the Government of the USSR.

In 1965 he graduated from the acting department of Schepkin Theater School (combined course GITIS and VTU - teachers V. I. Tsygankov and L. A. Volkov).

He studied on the same course with Inna Churikova and Tamara Degtyaryova and auditioned with them at the Moscow Youth Theater, where he entered service after graduation.

Kosarev's first film practice was with People's Artist of the Soviet Union Grigory Alexandrov on the set of the film "Starling and Lyra". In 1973, he graduated from the directing department VGIKa (workshop of Igor Talankin). Alexander Kosarev's graduation film One Hundred Steps in the Clouds amazed Sergey Bondarchuk, who happened to be in the studio to re-record the music for the film: "Before I knew, only one film about the working class -" Height "Zarkhi… Today I saw the second film." Bondarchuk brought a talented debutant to the 1st creative association "Mosfilma" to the director N. T. Sizov with the words: "Here is a man who will make a big movie".

After graduating from VGIK, Alexander Kosarev continued to make more films, attaching great importance to scripts and being a co-author of many of them. Kosarev appreciated professionalism in his work. He almost always worked with the same film crew of cameramen, lighting, and make-up artists.

Several actors starred with Alexander Kosarev in several films, including Peter Velyaminov, Ivan Lapikov, Roman Filippov, Daniil Netrebin, Mikhail Gluzsky, and Irina Korotkova.

The director attached great importance to the music that sounded in his films. Alexander Kosarev has worked with such composers as Alexey Rybnikov, Igor Krutoy, and Yuri Antonov. Several films featured songs written to the verses of Alexander Kosarev.

In 1997, Alexander Kosarev suffered a stroke, after which he could no longer return to the profession. The director died on January 19, 2013. He was buried in Moscow at Danilovskoye cemetery.

Family 
 Father - Boris Maksimovich Kosarev, (1911 - 1989) - photographer, photojournalist.
 Mother - Nina Pavlovna Kosareva, (1916 - 2012) - teacher of biology and chemistry.
 Wife - Irina Yuryevna Korotkova, (born August 25, 1947) - actress.
 Daughter - Maria Alexandrovna Kosareva

Creativity

Filmography

Directing work 
 1971 — Staircase (short)
 1973 — One Hundred Steps in the Clouds - thesis (short)
 1974 — My "Zhigulyonok" (short)
 1975 — When the Earth Shakes
 1977 — Night over Chile
 1980 — I wish you success
 1982 — Urgent… Secret… Gubchek  (and lyricist)
 1984 — Before parting (and lyricist)
 1989 — Souvenir for the prosecutor (and songwriter)
 1991 — Predators (and songwriter)
 1993 — Hostages of The Devil

Movie roles 
 1970 — Two in December (short) - He
 1973 — Origins - episode (uncredited)
 1989 — Souvenir for the prosecutor - Fadey Fadeyevich
 1991 — Predators - Guy, director of the reserve
 1993 — Hostages of the "Devil" - investigator Chikurov

Scenarios 
 1984 — Before parting
 1989 — Souvenir for the prosecutor
 1991 — Predators
 1993 — Hostages of The Devil

Poetry 
Songs in collaboration
 with Yuri Antonov (performed by him):
 "About You and Me" (in the movie "Before we part")
 "Intoxicated Lilac" (in the film "Predators")
 "Somewhere…" (in the film "Before we part")
 "The long-awaited plane" (in the film "Before we part")
 "Eccentric in love", performed by Ekaterina Semenova from the movie "Predators".
 with Igor Krutoy for the film "A souvenir for the prosecutor":
 "Day of Love" (for the first time sounded in the film, performed by Igor Talkov)
 "Four Brothers" (for the first time sounded in the film, performed by the singer Larisa Dolina)
 "A moment of luck" (for the first time sounded in the film, performed by the singer Alexandra Serov)
 "How to be" / "Maybe not to rush the night and repeat everything from the beginning" (sounded for the first time in the film, performed by Aleksandr_Kosarev singer Alexandra Serov)

Plays 
 "Jolly Cake" (Moscow Puppet Theatre)
 Geese-Swans (Moscow Puppet Theatre)

Short films

"Ladder" (1971) 
Short film 1971, academic work at VGIK. Plot: A simple comeback story.

Cast:
 Anatoly Bystrov
 Maria Zorina

Film crew:
 Director's work - Alexander Kosarev (Chair of Film Directing, workshop of Igor Talankin, teachers Emilia Kirillovna Kravchenko, V.T. Romanova)
 Camera work - Boris Kustov (department of cameramanship, workshop of L.V. Kosmatova, master-director V.A. Ginzburg)
 Film director — T. Austriavskaya

"One Hundred Steps in the Clouds" (1973) 
Short film of 1973, diploma work at VGIK. Plot: after demobilization, Vasily and his friends arrive at the shock construction site of a hydroelectric power station, the crooked Sanka Prokhorov is in charge of a team of high-rise assemblers. Vasily comes into conflict with him.

Cast:
 Mikhail Gluzsky - foreman, Mitroshin
 Boris Rudnev - Vasily
 German Kachin — foreman, Senka Prokhorov
 Irina Korotkova — girl operator
 Alexander Lebedev — worker

Film crew:
 Director — Alexander Kosarev
 Screenwriter — Anatoly Bezuglov
 Director of photography - Igor Bogdanov
 ArtistNickname — Vasily Golikov
 Composer — Alexey Rybnikov
 The song in the film is performed by Valentina Nikulina to lyrics by A. Alshutov

"My Zhiguli" (1974) 
A satirical film about what can happen to a car enthusiast if he turns to the private services of "masters" and all kinds of lovers to earn extra money. The film was shot by order of the UGAI of the Ministry of Internal Affairs of the USSR.

Cast:
 Georgy Vitsin — Uncle Zhenya
 Galina Mikeladze — client

In episodes (uncredited):
 Anatoly Obukhov — uncle Zhenya's partner
 Boris Rudnev - GAI officer

Film crew:
 Director — Alexander Kosarev
 Screenwriter — Tikhon Nepomniachtchi
 Operator — V. Masevich
 Artist — Vasily Golikov

On the glass of Uncle Zhenya's truck are photographs Yury Nikulin - in the role of Stooge (magazine clipping) and a photo postcard "Actors of Soviet cinema", which in Soviet times were sold in kiosks "Soyuzpechat".

Awards 
 Honored Art Worker of the Dagestan ASSR (1976) - for the film "When the earth trembles" (1975)
 Special Prize Moscow International Film Festival for the film "Night over Chile" (1977)

References

External links 
 Alexander Kosarev on the website of the Guild of Film Directors of Russia
 
 Songs based on verses by Alexander Kosarev on the site 100 records
 Irina Korotkova about Alexander Kosarev, Expert Online 17 Mar 2014
 Alexander Kosarev in Vyacheslav Sergeechev's story "Chukhlin's Childhood" (excerpt)
 Memories of childhood and Alexander Kosarev in Vyacheslav Sergeechev's story "Chukhlin's Childhood"
 Boris Maksimovich Kosarev in Vyacheslav Sergeechev's Stalin's Album
 Short film Ladder (1971)
 Short film One Hundred Steps in the Clouds (1973)
 Short film My Zhiguli (1974)

Russian songwriters